Mohibullah (born 2 September 1989) is a Pakistani first-class cricketer who plays for Quetta cricket team.

References

External links
 

1989 births
Living people
Pakistani cricketers
Quetta cricketers
People from Pishin District